The Lordship of Annandale was a sub-comital lordship in southern Scotland (Annandale) established by David I of Scotland by 1124 for his follower Robert de Brus. The following were holders of the office:

Robert de Brus, 1st Lord of Annandale, 1113 x 1124-1138
Robert de Brus, 2nd Lord of Annandale, 1138 x-1194
William de Brus, 3rd Lord of Annandale, 1194-1211 x 1212
Robert de Brus, 4th Lord of Annandale, 1211 x 1212-1226 x 1233
Robert de Brus, 5th Lord of Annandale, 1226 x 1233–1292; resigned the lordship to Annadale on the accession of  John Balliol in 1292.
Robert de Brus, 6th Lord of Annandale, 1292-1295
 John Comyn III of Badenoch, 1295–1296; Annandale seized and granted to John on Robert's refusal to attend the Scottish host.
Robert de Brus, 6th Lord of Annandale, 1296-1304
Robert de Brus, 7th Lord of Annandale (King Robert), 1304-1312
Thomas Randolph, 8th Lord of Annandale, 1312–32
Thomas Randolph, 9th Lord of Annandale, 1332
John Randolph, 10th Lord of Annandale, 1332–46
Agnes Randolph, 11th Lady of Annandale, 1346-1369
m. Patrick Dunbar, 9th Earl of Dunbar
George de Dunbar, 12th Lord of Annandale, 1369-1401/9 (although under part English control until 1384; conquered by Douglas in 1401 after Dunbar went over to the English; Douglas possession confirmed in 1409)
Archibald Douglas, 13th Lord of Annandale, 1401/9-24
Archibald Douglas, 14th Lord of Annandale, 1424-1439
William Douglas, 15th Lord of Annandale, 1439–40
Annexed to Crown
Alexander Stewart, 16th Lord of Annandale, 1455-1485
John Stewart, 17th Lord of Annandale ?, 1485-1536
Crown

See also
Earl of Carrick
Scotland in the High Middle Ages
Earldom of Annandale

References

 Barrow, G.W.S., ‘Robert I (1274–1329)’, Oxford Dictionary of National Biography, Oxford University Press, 2004 accessed 16 Nov 2006
 Duncan, A.A.M., ‘Brus , Robert (I) de, lord of Annandale (d. 1142)’, Oxford Dictionary of National Biography, Oxford University Press, 2004 accessed 16 Nov 2006
 Duncan, A.A.M.,  ‘Brus , Robert (II) de, lord of Annandale (d. 1194?)’, Oxford Dictionary of National Biography, Oxford University Press, 2004 accessed 16 Nov 2006
 Duncan, A.A.M., ‘Brus , Robert (V) de , lord of Annandale (c.1220–1295)’, Oxford Dictionary of National Biography, Oxford University Press, Sept 2004; online edn, Oct 2005 accessed 16 Nov 2006
 Duncan, A.A.M., ‘Brus , Robert (VI) de, earl of Carrick and lord of Annandale (1243–1304)’, Oxford Dictionary of National Biography, Oxford University Press, 2004 accessed 16 Nov 2006

House of Bruce

Baronies in the Baronage of Scotland
Clan Comyn